is a city located in western Shizuoka Prefecture, Japan.  the city had an estimated population of 791,707 in 340,591 households, making it the prefecture's largest city, and a population density of .

Overview
Hamamatsu is a member of the World Health Organization’s Alliance for Healthy Cities  (AFHC).

Cityscapes

Geography 

Hamamatsu consists of a flat plain and the Mikatahara Plateau in the south, and a mountainous area in the north. It is roughly bordered by Lake Hamana to the west, the Tenryū River to the east, and the Pacific Ocean to the south.

Climate 
The climate in southern Hamamatsu has a humid subtropical climate with cool to mild winters with little snowfall; however, it is windy in winter because of the dry monsoon called Enshū no Karakaze, which is unique to the region. The climate in northern Hamamatsu is much harsher because of foehn winds. Summer is hot with the highest temperature often exceeds 35 degrees in the Tenryu-ku area, while it snows in winter.

Demographics 
Per Japanese census data, the population of Hamamatsu has been increasing over the past 70 years.

Foreign population

Hamamatsu has a significant non-Japanese population. The population of Nikkei foreigners, especially Brazilians increased after a 1990 change in Japanese immigration law allowed them to work in Japan. At one point, Hamamatsu had the largest Brazilian Nikkei population of any Japanese city, Many foreigners work in the manufacturing sector, taking temporary jobs in Honda, Suzuki, and Yamaha plants.  the number of non-Japanese in Hamamatsu was 33,332, and by 2010 the number exceeded 30,000. The city has a lot of Portuguese signage. It includes a Brazilian school, and many businesses catering to Brazilians display Brazilian flags. However, Natsuko Fukue of The Japan Times wrote in 2010 that many foreign children have difficulty integrating to society in Hamamatsu because "Japanese and foreign communities live largely separate from one another."

The foreign population dropped significantly in the aftermath of the global financial crisis in 2008, with the Hamamatsu city government offering aid for some foreign nationals to return to their home countries.

Neighboring municipalities
Shizuoka Prefecture
Iwata
Kosai
Shimada
Mori
Kawanehon
Aichi Prefecture
Toyohashi
Shinshiro
Tōei
Toyone
Nagano Prefecture
Iida
Tenryū

History

Prehistoric Ages
The area now comprising Hamamatsu has been settled since prehistoric times, with numerous remains from the Jōmon period and Kofun period having been discovered within the present city limits, including the Shijimizuka site shell mound and the Akamonue Kofun ancient tomb.

Ancient Ages
In the Nara period, it became the capital of Tōtōmi Province.

Middle Ages
During the Sengoku period, Hamamatsu Castle was the home of future shōgun Tokugawa Ieyasu.

Early Modern Ages
Hamamatsu flourished during the Edo period under a succession of daimyō rulers as a castle town, and as a post town on the Tōkaidō highway connecting Edo with Kyoto.

Late Modern Ages
After the Meiji Restoration, Hamamatsu became a short-lived prefecture from 1871 to 1876, after which it was united with Shizuoka Prefecture. 
Hamamatsu Station opened on the Tōkaidō Main Line in 1889.

The same year, with the establishment of the modern municipalities system, Hamamatsu became a town.

 July 1, 1911: Hamamatsu is upgraded from a town to a city
 1918: Rice riots of 1918 affect Hamamatsu
 1921: The village of Tenjinchō merges with Hamamatsu
 1926: Imperial Japanese Army Hamamatsu Air Base opens
 1933: Imperial Japanese Army Flight School opens
 1936: The villages of Hikuma and Fujizuka merge with Hamamatsu
 December 7, 1944: Tonankai earthquake causes much damage
 June 1945: Hamamatsu largely destroyed by US air raids

Contemporary Ages
 1948: Hamamatsu Incident, ethnic rioting of Zainichi Korean residents.
 1951: The villages of Aratsu, Goto, and Kawarin merge with Hamamatsu
 1954: Eight villages in Hamana District merge with Hamamatsu
 1955: The village of Miyakoda merges with Hamamatsu
 1957: The village of Irino merges with Hamamatsu
 1960: The village of Seto merges with Hamamatsu
 1961: The village of Shinohara merges with Hamamatsu
 1965: The village of Shonai merges with Hamamatsu
 May 1, 1990: Hamamatsu Arena opened
 January 1, 1991: The village of Kami in Hamana District merges with Hamamatsu.
 April 1, 1991: The first Hamamatsu International Piano Competition was held.
 May 1, 1994: Act City Tower opened.
 October 1, 1995: Hamamatsu Museum of Musical Instruments opened.
 April 1, 1996: Hamamatsu is designated a core city by the central government.
 June 1, 1996: Hamamatsu City Fruit Park opened.
 April 1, 1997: Hamamatsu is designated as an Omnibus Town.
 April 1, 1998: Act City Musical School opened.
 April 3, 2000: Shizuoka University of Art and Culture opened.
 July 1, 2001: The city's 90th anniversary is commemorated
 August 1, 2002: Launched the conference on Pan-Hamanako Designated City Simulation.
 April 1, 2003: Shizuoka New Kawafuji National High School Competition was held.
 June 1, 2003: Launched Tenryūgawa-Hamanako Region Merger Conference.
 April 8 – October 11, 2004: Pacific Flora 2004 (Shizuoka International Garden and Horticulture Exhibition) was held at Hamanako Garden Park.
 July 1, 2005: Hamamatsu absorbed the cities of Hamakita and Tenryū; the town of Haruno (from Shūchi District), the towns of Hosoe, Inasa and Mikkabi (all from Inasa District), the towns of Misakubo and Sakuma, the village of Tatsuyama (all from Iwata District), and the towns of Maisaka and Yūtō (both from Hamana District) were merged into Hamamatsu. Inasa District and Iwata District were both dissolved as a result of this merger. Therefore, there are no more villages left in Shizuoka Prefecture.
 April 1, 2007: Hamamatsu became a city designated by government ordinance by the central government.

Government

Hamamatsu has a mayor-council form of government with a directly elected mayor and a unicameral city legislature of 46 members. The city contributes 15 members to the Shizuoka Prefectural Assembly.

Wards 
Hamamatsu is administratively divided into seven wards:

External relations

Twin towns – sister cities

International
Sister City
Hamamatsu has ratified Music Culture Exchange Treaty with the following cities (however, of the following Rochester is the only official sister city):

Twinned Cities
Hamamatsu is twinned with:

Friendship cities

Economy 

Hamamatsu has been famous as an industrial city, especially for musical instruments and motorcycles. It also has been known for fabric industry, but most of those companies and factories went out of business in the 1990s. As of 2010, Greater Hamamatsu, Hamamatsu Metropolitan Employment Area, has a GDP of US$54.3 billion.
2014 Hamamatsu's GDP per capita(PPP) was US$41,470.

Companies headquartered in Hamamatsu
 Enkei Corporation
 Hamamatsu Photonics K.K.
 Kawai Musical Instruments Mfg.
 Roland Corporation
 Suzuki Motor Co.
 Tōkai Gakki (also known as Tokai Guitars Company Ltd.)
 Yamaha Corporation

Companies founded in Hamamatsu 
 Honda Motor Co.\
 Acty System

Media

Radio stations 
 FM Haro! (JOZZ6AB FM, 76.1 MHz)
 K-MIX (JOKU FM, 78.4 MHz)
 NHK FM (JOPK FM, 82.1 MHz)
 SBS Radio (1404 kHz / 94.7 MHz)
 Radio Phoenix (internet)

Transportation

Airways

Airport
Hamamatsu Air Base

There are no civilian airports in Hamamatsu.

Railways

High-Speed Rail
 Central Japan Railway Company
Tōkaidō Shinkansen：-  -
JR Central Hamamatsu workshop: maintenance facility for the Tōkaidō Shinkansen

Conventional Lines
 Central Japan Railway Company
Tōkaidō Main Line：-      -
Iida Line：-              -
 Enshū Railway
Enshū Railway Line：-                   
Tenryū Hamanako Railroad
Tenryū Hamanako Line：-                    -

Roads

Expressways
 Tōmei Expressway (Hamamatsu interchange, Hamamatsu Nishi interchange, and Mikkabi interchange)
 Shin-Tōmei Expressway

Hiways
 San-en Nanshin Expressway (under construction)

Bypasses
Hamamatsu Bypass
Hamana Bypass

Japan National Highways

Education

Colleges and universities 
 Hamamatsu Gakuin University
 Hamamatsu University
 Hamamatsu University School of Medicine
 Seirei Christopher University
 Shizuoka University (Faculty of Engineering and Faculty of Informatics)
 Shizuoka University of Art and Culture
 Seisa University, Hamamatsu campus
Tokoha University, Hamamatsu campus

Primary and secondary schools 

Senior high schools operated by Shizuoka Prefecture:
 Shizuoka Prefectural Hamamatsu North High School (静岡県立浜松北高等学校)
 Shizuoka Prefectural Hamamatsu Nishi (West) Senior and Junior High Schools (静岡県立浜松西高等学校・中等部)
 Shizuoka Prefectural Hamamatsu East High School (静岡県立浜松東高等学校)
 Shizuoka Prefectural Hamamatsu South High School (静岡県立浜松南高等学校)
 Shizuoka Prefectural Kiga High School (静岡県立気賀高等学校)
 Shizuoka Prefectural Kohoku High School (静岡県立浜松湖東高等学校)
 Shizuoka Prefectural Mikkabi High School (静岡県立三ヶ日高等学校)

There is one senior high school operated by the city government: Hamamatsu Municipal Senior High School

Elementary and junior high schools are operated by the city government. , the city had 117 public elementary schools and 52 public junior high schools.

Multicultural education 
The city has the following Brazilian international schools:
 Escola Brasil (former Escola Brasileira de Hamamatsu) – Primary and secondary school
 Escola Alegria de Saber – Primary and secondary school
 Escola Alcance – Primary school

It has one combined Peruvian school (ペルー学校) and Brazilian primary school, Mundo de Alegría.

The city formerly hosted other Brazilian schools, Colégio Pitágoras Brasil and Escola Cantinho Feliz.

As of May 1, 2009, the municipal elementary and junior high schools had 1,638 non-Japanese students. , there were 932 Brazilians enrolled in Hamamatsu's municipal elementary and junior high schools: 646 Brazilians were enrolled in 61 public elementary schools, and 286 Brazilians were enrolled in 38 public junior high schools.

Within public schools Brazilian students have the same academic programs and take the same classes as Japanese nationals. Special teachers and assistants work with foreign students at municipal elementary and junior high schools with significant numbers of non-Japanese enrolled. In particular the schools use their part-time interpreters to assist Brazilian students. The interpreters are not formal teachers, yet Tsutsumi Angela Aparecida of Hamamatsu's Burajiru Fureai Kai wrote that "[t]heir assistance 
has become very useful". Toshiko Sugino of the National Defense Academy of Japan wrote that the municipal and prefectural schools in Hamamatsu "follow traditional views of education and enforce rigid school rules" despite the reputation of open-mindedness in the residents of Hamamatsu, causing some foreigners to send their non-Japanese children to foreign private schools.

 many Brazilian parents have difficulty in deciding whether to send their children to Japanese schools or Brazilian schools, and it is common for Brazilian children attending Japanese schools to switch to a Brazilian school and vice versa. By 2010 many Brazilian parents had lost their jobs due to an economic decline, and many were unable to afford the Brazilian school monthly tuitions of ¥30,000 to ¥40,000.

 about 50% of Brazilians of high school age in Hamamatsu do not attend high school. The inability to afford high school and difficulty with Japanese resulted in lower high school attendance rates. Hamamatsu NPO Network Center has made efforts to increase school attendance.

In Hamamatsu volunteers and a non-profit organization have established Japanese-language classes and native language classes for foreign children.

Local attractions 
 Act City Tower Observatory: Hamamatsu's only skyscraper, situated next to JR Hamamatsu Station, is a symbol of the city. It was designed to resemble a harmonica, a reminder that Hamamatsu is sometimes known as the "City of Music".  The building houses shopping and a food court, the Okura Hotel, and an observatory on the 45th floor overlooking all of central Hamamatsu, even down to the sand dunes at the shore.
 Chopin Monument This is a 1:1-scale replica of the famous Art Nouveau bronze statue of Chopin by the famed artist Wacław Szymanowski. The original is in Hamamatsu's sister city, Warsaw.　
 Hamamatsu Castle: Hamamatsu Castle Park stretches from the modern city hall building to the north. The castle is located on a hill in the southeast corner of the park, near city hall. It was built by Tokugawa Ieyasu. His rule marks the beginning of the Edo period. Tokugawa Ieyasu lived here from 1571 to 1588.  There is a small museum inside, which houses some armor and other relics of the period, as well as a miniature model of how the city might have looked 400 years ago. North of the castle is a large park with a Japanese garden, a koi pond, a ceremonial teahouse, and some commons areas.
 Nakatajima Sand Dunes: one of the three largest sand dune areas in Japan
 Hamamatsu Flower Park
 Hamamatsu Fruit Park
 Hamamatsu Municipal Zoo
 Iinoya-gū shrine
 Motoshirochō Tōshō-gū shrine

Culture

Festivals

Akiha Fire Festival
 Haruno, Tenryu-ku: December
Long ago, Mount Akiha was believed to have supernatural powers to prevent fires. Bow and arrow, sword, and fire dances are performed at the Akiha Shrine. At the Akiha Temple, a firewalking ceremony is performed where both believers and spectators celebrate the festival.

Enshū Dainenbutsu
 Saigagake Museum, Hamamatsu City: July 15
When a family commemorates the first Obon holidays after the death of a loved one, they may request that a dainenbutsu (Buddhist chanting ritual) be performed outside their house. This is one of the local performing arts of the region. The group always forms a procession in front of the house led by a person carrying a lantern and marches to the sound of flutes, Japanese drums and cymbals.

Hamamatsu Kite Festival
 Naka-ku, Minami-ku, others: May
Hamamatsu Kite Festival is also called Hamamatsu Festival. Hamamatsu Kite Festival held from May 3 to May 5 each year, includes a Tako Gassen, or kite fight, and luxuriously decorated palace-like floats. The festival originated about 430 years ago, when the lord of Hamamatsu Castle celebrated the birth of his first son by flying kites. In the Meiji Era, the celebration of the birth of a first son by flying Hatsu Dako, or the first kite, became popular, and this tradition has survived in the form of Hamamatsu Kite Festival. During the nights of Hamamatsu Kite Festival, people parade downtown carrying over 70 yatai, or palace-lake floats, that are beautifully decorated while playing Japanese traditional festival music. The festival reaches its peak when groups representing the city's various districts compete by energetically marching through the downtown streets.

Hamakita Hiryu Festival
 Hamakita-ku: June
This festival is held in honor of Ryujin, the god believed to be associated with the Tenryū River, and features a wide variety of events such as the Hamakita takoage (kite flying) event and the Hiryu himatsuri (flying dragon fire festival) which celebrates water, sound, and flame.

Hamamatsu International Piano Competition
 November
This festival celebrates Hamamatsu's history as a city of musical instruments and music, and brings dozens of the best young pianists from all over the world. It has been held triennially since 1991 at the Act City Concert Hall and Main Hall.

Hamakita Man'yō Festival
 Hamakita-ku, Hamamatsu: October
This event takes place in Man'yō-no-Mori Park to commemorate the Man'yō period and introduce its culture. As part of the festival, people reenact the ancient past by wearing traditional clothes from the Heian period and presenting Japanese poetry readings.

Inasa Puppet Festival
 Inasa, Kita-ku: November
One of the few puppet festivals held in Japan, featuring 60 performances of about 30 plays by puppet masters from all over the country. The shows provide a full day of enjoyment for both children and adults.

Princess Road Festival
 Hosoe, Kita-ku: April
This reenactment of a procession made by the princess in her palanquin along with her entourage of over 100 people including maids, samurai, and servants makes for a splendid scene beneath the cherry blossoms along the Toda River. In the Edo period, princesses enjoyed traveling this road which came to be known as a hime kaidō (princess road).

Samba Festival
The Hamamatsu Samba Festival is held in the city.

Shoryu Weeping Ume Blossom Festival
 Inasa, Kita-ku: late February to late March
In Ryusui Garden there is a stream with seven small waterfalls and about 80 weeping ume trees pruned to give the appearance of dragons riding on clouds to the heavens. There are also 200 young trees planted along the mountainside.

Sports

Football
 Honda FC which plays Japan Football League (third division) games at their own Miyakoda Soccer Stadium. Honda competed in the Japan Soccer League's First Division from 1981 to 1991, but chose to relegate itself and not compete in the professional divisions due to parent company Honda's choice to retain team ownership. Many Hamamatsu football fans prefer to follow Júbilo Iwata, across the Tenryū River in Iwata. Júbilo maintains a club shop within Hamamatsu.
 Volare FC Hamamatsu, an autonomous club who competed in the Tokai Regional Football League Division 2 in 2011, flouted plans to either overtake Honda FC or merge with it, but it finished last in the Tokai League and was relegated. Hamamatsu University also keeps a team in the said division, but college teams cannot be promoted to the top three tiers.

Basketball
 SAN-EN NeoPhoenix plays in the B.League, Japan's first division of professional basketball. The team plays its home games at the Toyohashi City General Gymnasium.

The Hamamatsu Arena was one of the host arenas of the 2006 FIBA World Championship.

Hamamatsu 3x3 FIBA: Placed Second at FIBA World Tour FInal in ABU Dhabi in 2016.
(Bikramjit Gill, Inderbir Gill, Chiro Kheda)

Women's volleyball
Hamamatsu was one of the host cities of the official 2010 Women's Volleyball World Championship.

Notable people

 Hiroshi Amano, 2014 Nobel Prize in Physics winner
 Haruhi Aiso, singer, songwriter
 Barasui, manga artist
 Yuri Chinen, J-pop talent, singer
 Yōsuke Fujigaya, professional football player
 Yuji Fujimoto, politician
 Ken Fujita, professional football player
 Hironoshin Furuhashi, Olympic swimmer
 Kazuhiro Furuhashi, anime movie director
 Tatsuya Furuhashi, professional football player
 Taketoshi Gotoh, professional baseball player
 Akari Hibino, voice actress
 Coco Hayashi, voice actress
 Soichiro Honda, engineer, industrialist, founder of Honda Motor Company
 Yusuke Inuzuka, professional football player 
 Yasuhide Ito, composer
 Toshio Kakei, actor
 Takeshi Kamo, Olympic football player
 Yoko Kando, Olympic swimmer
 Naoyuki Kato, illustrator
 Genichi Kawakami, former president of Yamaha
 Keisuke Kinoshita, movie director
 Naoyuki Kinoshita, art historian
 Sanae Kobayashi, voice actress
 Shigetatsu Matsunaga, professional football player
 Takuya Matsuura, professional football player
 Kanako Momota, J-pop singer and leader of Momoiro Clover Z
 Kiiti Morita, mathematician
 Ken Namba, composer
 Jiro Ono, renowned sushi chef
 Yuki Oshitani, professional football player	
 Ken'ya Ōsumi, dancer
 Keisuke Ota, professional football player
 Yoshiaki Ota, professional football player
 Fumiya Sankai, Vlogger and actor in the Philippines, recording artist, and a businessman
 Kentaro Sato, composer
 Shinichiro Sawai, movie director, screenwriter
 Goro Shimura, mathematician
 Ryu Shionoya, politician
 Hideto Suzuki, professional football player
 Koji Suzuki, science-fiction writer
 Michio Suzuki, founder of Suzuki Motors
 Yasutomo Suzuki, politician, mayor of Hamamatsu
 Saya Takagi, actress
 Kenjiro Takayanagi, engineer, pioneer in development of the television
 Nobuhiro Takeda, professional football player
 Kenji Tsuruta, manga artist
 Kōji Tsuruta, actor
 Azumi Uehara, J-pop singer
 Hiromi Uehara, Jazz composer, pianist
 Tetsuya Wakuda, Japanese-Born Australian Chef
 Kosuke Yamamoto, professional football player
 Masaaki Yanagishita, professional football player
 Kisho Yano, professional football player

See also 

 Nikkei Brazilians at a Brazilian School in Japan

References

External links 

  
  
 In Hamamatsu
 
 
 Hamamatsu Daisuki Net (I love Hamamatsu)  

 
Brazilian communities
Cities in Shizuoka Prefecture
Populated coastal places in Japan
Cities designated by government ordinance of Japan